Giorgio Jegher (28 August 1937 – 20 January 1997) was an Italian long-distance runner. He competed in the marathon at the 1964 Summer Olympics.

References

External links
 

1937 births
1997 deaths
Athletes (track and field) at the 1964 Summer Olympics
Italian male long-distance runners
Italian male marathon runners
Olympic athletes of Italy
Athletes from Rome